Jessica Martina Wahls (born 2 February 1977), also known under her nickname Jess, is a German pop singer and television host, who rose to fame as one of the founding members of the successful all-female pop band No Angels, the "biggest-selling German girlband to date", according to the German media.

Biography

Early life
Wahls is the only child born to an African-American father, James, and a German mother, Gabriele "Gabi" Wahls. Her parents separated when she was six months old, and thus, Jessica was raised by her single mother near Bad Nauheim, in the Wetteraukreis district of Hesse. After her parents' divorce, Wahls had little contact with her father, and her mother worked as a personal assistant to support the family. In 1999, Gabriele married Wahls' Barbadian stepfather Tosh. 

In 2000, Jessica broke off her training as a travel management assistant to join the girl group No Angels, the result of a German version of the international television show Popstars. Two successful years later, Jess became pregnant by boyfriend, choreographer and background dancer Sascha Dickreuter, and consequently she had to leave the band for her baby girl by the name of Cheyenne Jessica.

2003–2006: Solo career launch
Following her departure from No Angels, Wahls remained with the Cheyenne label through which she launed a solo career in mid-2003. In September 2003, "Ten Steps Back", a dance pop track co-written by Kandi Burruss, was released as her solo debut single. Overshadowed by the announcement that the remaining No Angels quartet would disband in fall 2003, the song debuted and peaked at number 41 on the German Singles Chart only, also reaching the top sixty in Austria. In November, Wahls along with Dickreuter appeared in four episodes of the second season of Stardance on the German KiKa channel in which they taught Dickreuter's choreography from the "Ten Steps Back" music video. The same month, she joined the supergroup TV Allstars for the recording of a cover version of the 1984 Band Aid song "Do They Know It's Christmas?". It reached number three in Germany and was later certified going gold by the BVMI. Wahls also recorded a solo version of the holiday classic "Winter Wonderland" which was included on the supergroup's Christmas compilation album The Ultimate Christmas Album. 

Also in November 2003, Wahls re-joined No Angels on a couple of selected dates surrounding the promotion of their farewell compilation album The Best of No Angels and its lead single "Reason", on which she was credited as part of the band again. Wahls also appeared as a special surprise guest at the group's last 2003 concert at the Olympiahalle in Munich. Her second solo single, "Don't Get Me Started", was released in August 2004. The summerly mid-tempo track peaked at number 51 on the German Singles Chart and would remain her final release with Cheyenne Records after the termination of her contract in late-2004.  Her solo album, for which she had recorded several tracks since 2003, including "Crime" and "No More", was eventually shelved by Cheyenne. The same year, Wahls lent her vocals to the track "When We Kiss" from German duo Marshall & Alexander's album Lovers Forever (2004). 

In March 2005, Wahls made her German language debut with the release of her third single "Du bist wie ich", her debut with Polydor. Serving as the theme song for the KiKa live show KiKA LIVE, it reached number 78 in Germany. Another single, the self-penned "Bedinungslos", was released in November 2005 and marked Wahls' debut with Maseco Records. It peaked at number 92 on the German Singles Chart. As with Cheyenne, the release of an album failed to materialize after the label went bankrupt. Wahls later released several songs to her MySpace account.

Discography

Singles
As lead artist

As featured artist

References

External links
 JessicaWahls.tv – Official website

Wahls, Jesscia
Living people
German women pop singers
English-language singers from Germany
German people of African-American descent
Musicians from Frankfurt
Television people from Frankfurt
No Angels members
Eurovision Song Contest entrants of 2008
Eurovision Song Contest entrants for Germany

Popstars winners